720 Bohlinia is a minor planet orbiting the Sun that was discovered by Franz Kaiser, a German astronomer in 1911. It is named for Swedish astronomer Karl Petrus Theodor Bohlin, to mark his 65th birthday.  He had worked on the orbits of asteroids.

It is one of the Koronis family of asteroids. A group of astronomers, including Lucy d’Escoffier Crespo da Silva and Richard P. Binzel, used observations made between 1998 through 2000 to determine the spin-vector alignment of these asteroids. The collaborative work resulted in the creation of 61 new individual rotation lightcurves to augment previous published observations.

Binzel and Schelte Bus further added to the knowledge about this asteroid in a lightwave survey published in 2003. This project was known as Small Main-belt Asteroid Spectroscopic Survey, Phase II  or SMASSII, which built on a previous survey of the main-belt asteroids. The visible-wavelength (0.435-0.925 micrometre) spectra data was gathered between August 1993 and March 1999.

References

External links
 
 

Koronis asteroids
Bohlinia
Bohlinia
S-type asteroids (Tholen)
Sq-type asteroids (SMASS)
19111018